Chiarini is an Italian surname. Notable people with the surname include:

Daniele Chiarini (born 1979), Italian footballer
Gianfranco Chiarini (born 1966), Italian chef and television personality
Luigi Chiarini (1789 – 1832), Italian abbot, orientalist and translator
Marcantonio Chiarini (c. 1652 – 1730), Italian painter
Mario Chiarini (born 1981), Italian baseball player
Pietro Chiarini (c. 1717 – 1765), Italian composer
Riccardo Chiarini (born 1984), Italian cyclist

See also
10376 Chiarini, main-belt asteroid

Italian-language surnames